{{DISPLAYTITLE:C12H13N3O2}}
The molecular formula C12H13N3O2 (molar mass : 231.25 g/mol) may refer to:

 Farampator
 Isocarboxazid
 Triaziquone, a drug used in chemotherapy

References 
ChemSpider Properties of C12H13N3O2